Yeerongpilly is a southern suburb in the City of Brisbane, Queensland, Australia.

Geography 

A small section of the north eastern boundary runs along Ipswich Road.

History 
Yeerongpilly is an Aboriginal word meaning rain coming according to Thomas Petrie or is derived from the Aboriginal words yurong meaning rain or yarung meaning sandy or gravelly. The suffix "pilly" means a gully or watercourse.

Yeerongpilly grew from an area named Boggo, which was logged for timber for Brisbane.

In April 1885, "Lathorn Estate" made up of 118 allotments were advertised to be auctioned by James R. Dickson & Co. A map advertising the auction states the Estate consisted of 118 subdivisions of 131 Portion, Parish of Yeerongpilly. Newspaper advertising states the Estate was "situated at the junction of Ipswich and Boggo Roads" and "within a quarter of a mile of Yeerong Railway Station".

In October 1887, 24 large allotments of the "Ortive Estate" were advertised to be auctioned by G. T. Bell, Auctioneer. A map advertising the auction states the Estate was "close to South Coast Junction Railway Station." Newspaper advertising states the Estate was "within stone throw of railway station" with "24 grand large-sized building allotments, all over 20 perches".

In February 1890, "Grand View Estate" made up of 18 allotments were advertised to be auctioned by John W. Todd. A map advertising the auction states the Estate was bordered by Fairfield Road and Boundary Road. Newspaper advertising states the Estate was "directly opposite the South Brisbane cemetery" and offers "magnificent views of the River, Mountains and surrounding land."

The Brisbane Golf Club was established in the suburb in 1896.

A Queensland Government research complex, last known as the Animal Research Institute, occupied a site adjacent to Fairfield Road from 1909 to 2011.

In October 1927, 14 allotments of "Riverside Estate" were advertised to be auctioned by Thornton & Pearce, Auctioneers. A map advertising the auction states that the Estate was "only a few yards from Tennyson station, within easy walking distance". Newspaper advertising states the Estate allotments were "the last of the select, High River frontage sites" with "appealing views of the river and mountains".The Brisbane River makes up a very small section of the northern boundary of the locality while a small section of the western boundary follows Oxley Creek. Parts of Yeerongpilly were affected by the 2010–2011 Queensland floods. Insurance claims for damage created by the flood were the second highest in the state, according to Suncorp Insurance.

The median age of the Yeerongpilly population was 32 years. The most common ancestries in Yeerongpilly were English 25.9%, Australian 21.0%, Irish 11.6%, Scottish 8.5% and German 4.0%. In Yeerongpilly (State Suburbs), 70.2% of people were born in Australia. The most common countries of birth were New Zealand 3.6%, England 3.4%, India 1.9%, Vietnam 1.5% and China (excludes SARs and Taiwan) 1.3%. 78.1% of people only spoke English at home. Other languages spoken at home included Vietnamese 2.1%, Mandarin 1.4%, Arabic 1.1%, Cantonese 1.0% and Spanish 0.9%.

Heritage listings 

Yeerongpilly has a number of heritage-listed sites, including:

 740 Fairfield Road: Trainmen's Quarters
 681 Fairfield Road & 41 Godiva Street : Animal Research Institute Buildings
 14 Grosvenor Street: Craigilea (house)
 53 Nathan Terrace: former St Giles Uniting Church (also known as Yeerongpilly Presbyterian Church)
 12 Tees Street: Revoncourt (house)
 70 Tennyson Memorial Avenue: Brisbane Golf Club Clubhouse
 32 Wingarra Street: Warra (house)

Education 
There are no schools in Yeerongpilly. The nearest primary school is Yeronga State School in Yeronga to the north. The nearest secondary school is Yeronga State High School in Yeronga.

Transport

Yeerongpilly railway station provides access to regular Queensland Rail City network services to Brisbane, Beenleigh and Ferny Grove.

The original proposal for the Cross River Rail project was to have its southern tunnel portal approximately at the Cardross St overbridge. The current proposal has relocated the southern tunnel portal to Dutton Park.

Sport 
The Brisbane Golf Club is a 36 hole, private golf club and includes facilities such as driving range and pro shop.

Notable people
 Ken Archer, an Australian cricketer was born in the suburb in 1928.
 Marty Mayberry, a double leg amputee Paralympic alpine skier born in 1986.

See also

 Shire of Yeerongpilly

References

External links

 
 
 

Suburbs of the City of Brisbane